Pearson G. Jordan (23 October 1950 – 28 March 2020) was a Barbadian sprinter. He competed in the men's 100 metres at the 1976 Summer Olympics. Jordan competed for the Louisiana State University Tigers from 1976 to 1979. He was part of the championship 4 × 400 m relay in 1979.

Jordan who was originally from Speightstown, Saint Peter, Barbados, died of complications from COVID-19 on 28 March 2020, at age 69 in Dallas during the COVID-19 pandemic in Texas.

References

External links

1950 births
2020 deaths
Athletes (track and field) at the 1976 Summer Olympics
Barbadian male sprinters
Olympic athletes of Barbados
Place of birth missing
LSU Tigers track and field athletes
Deaths from the COVID-19 pandemic in Texas